This is a list of reservoirs in the Czech Republic, larger than 2 square kilometres.

See also

List of lakes in the Czech Republic
List of ponds in the Czech Republic

Czech Republic

Dams